The 2020–21 Arkansas Razorbacks women's basketball team represents the University of Arkansas during the 2020–21 NCAA Division I women's basketball season. The Razorbacks, led by fourth-year head coach Mike Neighbors, play their home games at Bud Walton Arena and compete as members of the Southeastern Conference (SEC).

Preseason

SEC media poll
The SEC media poll was released on November 17, 2020.

Schedule and results
The Razorbacks' full schedule was released on November 16, 2020.

|-
!colspan=12 style=|Non-conference regular season

|-
!colspan=12 style=|SEC regular season

|-
!colspan=9 style=""|  SEC Tournament

|-
!colspan=9 style=""|  NCAA tournament

Players drafted into the WNBA

See also
2020–21 Arkansas Razorbacks men's basketball team

References

Arkansas Razorbacks women's basketball seasons
Arkansas
Arkansas Razorbacks
Arkansas Razorbacks
Arkansas